Carlos Rômulo Gonçalves e Silva, (24 January 1969 – ) is the bishop of Montenegro, a suffragan Latin diocese in the Ecclesiastical province of its mother see, the Metropolitan Archdiocese of Porto Alegre (in the state capital) in Rio Grande do Sul state, southernmost Brazil.

Biography

Early life and priesthood
Gonçalves e Silva was born in 1969 in Piratini, in the Archdiocese of Pelotas, Brazil. He entered the diocesan seminary of Pelotas, where he did his secondary studies. He studied philosophy in Catholic University of Pelotas, and theology in São Francisco de Paula seminary. He also earned a degree in spirituality in Rome and attended university courses in Brazil.

On 9 December 1994 he was ordained a priest. He was rector of the Diocesan Seminary and then General Vicar em Pelotas.

Bishop
On 22 March 2017, he was appointed Coadjutor Bishop of Roman Catholic Diocese of Montenegro by Pope Francis, and received episcopal consecration on 9 June by the most reverend Jacinto Bergmann.

References

1969 births
Living people
21st-century Roman Catholic bishops in Brazil
Roman Catholic bishops of Montenegro